Kwami Eninful (born 20 November 1984) is a Togolese footballer, he plays for Dynamic Togolais.

Career 
He began his career in 2002 with the Togolese-based club AS Douanes Lomé and moved in January 2006 to Sheriff Tiraspol in Moldova. In January 2008 he was loaned out from Sheriff to the Libyan top club Al-Ittihad Tripoli and played ten games for the club before he moved back in July 2008 to Sheriff. On 15 July 2009 Eninful signed for Tunisian Ligue Professionnelle 1 club Union Sportive Monastir. After one season with Union Sportive Monastir joined to Tunisian rival AS La Marsa.

References

1984 births
Living people
Togolese footballers
Togolese expatriate footballers
Expatriate footballers in Moldova
Togolese expatriate sportspeople in Moldova
Expatriate footballers in Libya
Togolese expatriate sportspeople in Libya
Expatriate footballers in Tunisia
Togolese expatriate sportspeople in Tunisia
Togo international footballers
Association football central defenders
FC Sheriff Tiraspol players
US Monastir (football) players
AS Marsa players
Moldovan Super Liga players
21st-century Togolese people